Theo Farris Lee Graham (born 20 June 1997) is a British actor. He gained prominence through his role as Hunter McQueen in the E4 soap opera Hollyoaks (2016–2018, 2022–), which earned him an award and a nomination at the British Soap Awards.

Early life and education
Graham is from Manchester. He attended St Peter's Roman Catholic High School and then pursued a BTEC Extended Diploma in Performing Arts at The Manchester College.

Career
Graham first appeared in the BBC One soap opera Doctors as Wade Benton in a 2015 episode. He then returned in 2016 for a five-episode arc as Barney Turner. Graham starred as Hunter McQueen in the E4 soap opera Hollyoaks from 2016 to 2018. For his performance, he won Best On-Screen Partnership at the 2018 British Soap Awards alongside Malique Thompson-Dwyer, as well as earning a nomination for Best Actor.

Graham had recurring and supporting roles in the 2016 ITV miniseries Brief Encounters and the 2019 5Star series Clink. In 2021, Graham played Zak in the second season of the BBC comedy-drama Flatmates and starred as Dane in first season the Netflix teen fantasy series Fate: The Winx Saga. He returned for Fate'''s second season, this time in a recurring role. On 17 October 2022, it was announced that Graham would reprise his role in Hollyoaks''.

Filmography

Awards and nominations

References

External links
 

Living people
1997 births
21st-century English male actors
Alumni of The Manchester College
English people of Jamaican descent
Black British male actors
English male soap opera actors
Male actors from Manchester